Siri och ishavspiraterna was the 2012 edition of Sveriges Radio's Christmas Calendar.

Plot

When Siri's sister is kidnapped by pirate Vithuvud, Siri decides to do what no grown-up dares: follow the pirates to the Arctic island where the pirates hide.

Episodes
 Systrar i Blåvik
 Plocka snöbär
 Miki är borta
 Siri på Polstjärnan
 Fredrik berättar en hemlighet
 Otto lurar Siri
 Akterseglad på Vargön
 Hos Skogsnanny
 Vitvargar och sjöjungfrur
 Att tjuvlyssna på tjuvar
 Fripassagerare på Bleckfisken
 En ny kamrat
 Musslor, morsor och mod
 Raskar över isen
 Ett kärt återseende
 Framme på den gömda ön
 Fast i fällan
 I gruvan
 Siri möter Vithuvud
 Vithuvuds plan
 Svart, rött och vitt
 Vithuvuds fall
 Återseende och avfärd
 Ett hoppets skepp

References
 

2012 radio programme debuts
2012 radio programme endings
Arctic in fiction
Fictional pirates
Sveriges Radio programmes